The Northern red muntjac (Muntiacus vaginalis) is a species of muntjac. It is found in numerous countries of south-central and southeast Asia.

Taxonomy 

It was recently found distinct from the Southern red muntjac (previously typically known as Indian muntjac) and includes all the population previously attributed to M. muntjak that are outside of Sunda and perhaps of Malaysia.

The subspecies bancanus, montanus, muntjak, nainggolani, peninsulae, pleiharicus, robinsoni, rubidus stays in the southern red muntjac (M. muntjak), while annamensis, aureus, curvostylis, grandicornis, nigripes are now attributed to the northern red muntjac (M. vaginalis).

Distribution 
The northern red muntjac occurs in twelve countries of south-central and south-east Asia including Pakistan, Bhutan, Myanmar, Nepal, India, Sri Lanka, Bangladesh, China, Cambodia, Laos, Thailand, and Vietnam.

It is also present in Hong Kong. Its presence in Malaysia is uncertain.

Conservation 

It is listed as "Least Concern" by the IUCN due to its large distribution, presence in protected areas and resilience to hunting and habitat change.

References

 
Mammals described in 1785